Blōtmōnaþ (modern English: blót month) was the Anglo-Saxon name for the month of November.

The name was recorded by the Anglo-Saxon scholar Bede in his treatise De temporum ratione (The Reckoning of  Time), saying "Blod-monath is month of immolations, for it was in this month that the cattle which were to be slaughtered were dedicated to the gods.”

An entry in the Menologium seu Calendarium Poeticum, an Anglo-Saxon poem about the months, explains that “this month is called Novembris in Latin, and in our language the month of sacrifice, because our forefathers, when they were heathens, always sacrificed in this month, that is, that they took and devoted to their idols the cattle which they wished to offer.”

See also

Germanic calendar
Anglo-Saxons
Old English

References

November
Old English